Professor Colleen Nelson is a scientist in prostate cancer research. Professor Nelson founded and directs the Australian Prostate Cancer Research Centre - Queensland (APCRC-Q). The Centre, based at the Translational Research Institute and the Princess Alexandra Hospital, spans the spectrum of discovery of new therapeutic targets and their preclinical and clinical development. Professor Nelson is also Chair of Prostate Cancer Research at Queensland University of Technology (QUT).

Biography 
Dr. Nelson established the Australian Prostate Cancer Research Centre-Queensland in 2007, and was a co-founder of the Vancouver Prostate Centre in 1998.  Dr. Nelson founded and is the director of the Federal Government funded Australian-Canadian Prostate Cancer Research Alliance, a global network of researchers, clinicians, academics, and scientists who work in prostate cancer research.

In 2010, Prof Nelson was appointed to the Movember Foundation's Board of Directors and serves as the Chair of Movember's Global Scientific Committee. This committee leads Movember's Global Action Plan to progress outcomes in prostate cancer research by facilitating global research collaboration projects.

In 1999 she established The Microarray Facility at The Prostate Centre for high throughput gene expression, second of its kind in Canada and the only large scale microarray facility in Western Canada.

Intellectual property from Prof Nelson's research has been licensed from University of British Columbia to OncoGenex Pharmaceuticals, a Vancouver-based biotechnology company. The lead agents are now in Phase II and Phase III clinical trials in North America.

Research 
Professor Nelson's expertise is in translational prostate cancer research, specifically in identification of potential therapeutic targets, their in vitro and in vivo validation, clinical validation through molecular pathology approaches, and their translation into potential clinical application. Professor Nelson has developed expertise in high throughput applications in microarray gene expression, gene regulation, animal models, prostate cancer, steroid hormones, molecular endocrinology, and targeted therapeutics.

Throughout her career, Prof Nelson has studied androgen action and the effects of androgen deprivation and progression to castrate resistant prostate cancer. Her laboratory made the seminal discovery that castrate resistant prostate tumours can synthesize their own androgens de novo from cholesterol. Recently, these findings have been extended to investigate the inter-relationships of androgen synthesis, prostate cancer progression, and metabolic syndrome.

Fellowships 
 2009–2014: Queensland Smart Futures Premier's Fellow
 2002–2007: Senior Faculty Scholar, Michael Smith Foundation for Health Research
 1997–2002: Canadian Institutes of Health Research Faculty Scholar
 1997–2004: NCIC Senior Research Fellowship Award
 1995–1997: Centennial Medical Research Council Fellow, Canada
 1990–1995: Senior Research Fellowship, National Cancer Institute of Canada

References

External links 
 |Australian Prostate Centre profile
  Queensland University of Technology profile
 |Australian Canadian Prostate Cancer Research Alliance profile
 Prostate Centre profile

Australian biochemists
Australian women chemists
Australian oncologists
Women oncologists
Living people
Year of birth missing (living people)